Mount Langya is a mountain located in Yi County, Hebei province about  southwest of Beijing.

Five heroes of Mount Langya
According to the mythology of the Communist Party of China, the "five heroes of Mount Langya" were five men who fought the Imperial Japanese Army atop Mount Langya during the Second Sino-Japanese War. They supposedly killed dozens and then committed suicide by throwing themselves off the top of the mountain to escape capture by the Japanese. Two of the Chinese soldiers survived, but all others perished. The story is celebrated in China; a Chinese court has written that the heroes and their story reflect "the national sentiments, historical memories and the national spirit" and are important "sources and components of modern China’s socialist core values". The story has been made into a movie.

Myth disputed
Hong Zhenkuai, a Chinese historian, has disputed the myth, saying that the five men had slipped rather than jumped, and that they had not in fact killed any Japanese soldiers. Jiang Keshi, a professor at Okayama University in Japan, found in a search of Japanese military records that no soldiers had died in their encounter with the five on Langya. Publishing doubts about the historicity of the official account of the story has been implicated in the closure of the magazine Yanhuang Chunqiu in 2016. A court decided in 2016 that the historian behind the article, Hong Zhenkuai, had defamed the heroes and was ordered to publicly apologize.

Gallery

See also
Mount Langya (Anhui)

References

External links

Mountains of Hebei
Baoding
Propaganda in China